"Round of Applause" is a song by American hip hop recording artist Waka Flocka Flame. The song, released October 14, 2011, serves as the lead single from his second studio album Triple F Life: Fans, Friends & Family. The track features Canadian rapper Drake and was produced by frequent collaborators Lex Luger and Southside.

Background
The song leaked, without Drake, in early August 2011. Drake remixed the song, and released it through his official blog October's Very Own, on September 11, 2011, stating: "First Lex Luger beat I ever got to rap on...feel like I got seat B60 on Southwest...everybody has gone in before me...but we made it happen!". On October 13, 2011, it was announced Waka Flocka Flame chose to master the remix and release it as the official single.

Music video
On January 20, 2012, Janice Llamoca, cheerleader of the LA Lakers released some footage of the making-of the music video, recorded with her iPhone. On January 30, official behind-the-scenes footage was released. On February 25, 2012, the official music video, directed by Mr. Boomtown was released. Young Money rapper Lil Chuckee and Draya from Basketball Wives make cameo appearances.

Chart performance
"Round of Applause" debuted at number 97 on the Billboard Hot 100 the week of December 24, 2011 and peaked at number 86 the week of December 31 before leaving the chart at the beginning of 2012. It reappeared on the week of January 21, 2012 at number 97 and reached number 89 for two non-consecutive weeks, remaining on the chart for eight weeks.

Weekly charts

Year-end charts

Release history

References

2011 songs
2011 singles
Waka Flocka Flame songs
Drake (musician) songs
Song recordings produced by Lex Luger (musician)
Songs written by Drake (musician)
Songs written by Waka Flocka Flame
Songs written by Lex Luger (musician)